Pine Creek Airfield was an emergency landing ground at Pine Creek, Northern Territory, Australia during World War II.

Civil airfield extended by B Company and HQ Detachment of the 808th Engineer Aviation Battalion between 11 May 1942 to 16 July 1942.

See also
 List of airports in the Northern Territory

References

External links
Pacific War Wrecks Database
OzatWar Website

Former Royal Australian Air Force bases
World War II airfields in Australia
Defunct airports in the Northern Territory